The Squaw Man's Son is a 1917 American Western silent film directed by Edward LeSaint, written by Charles Maigne and Edwin Milton Royle, and starring Wallace Reid, Anita King, Dorothy Davenport, Donald Bowles, Clarence Geldart and Frank Lanning. It was released on July 26, 1917, by Paramount Pictures.

Plot

Cast 
 Wallace Reid as Lord Effington
 Anita King as Wah-na-gi
 Dorothy Davenport as Edith, Lady Effington
 Donald Bowles as John McCloud
 Clarence Geldart as David Ladd
 Frank Lanning as Appah
 Ernest Joy as Lord Kerhill
 Lucien Littlefield as Lord Yester
 Mabel Van Buren as Lady Stuckley
 Raymond Hatton as Storekeeper

References

External links 
 

1917 films
1917 Western (genre) films
1910s English-language films
Paramount Pictures films
Films directed by Edward LeSaint
American black-and-white films
Silent American Western (genre) films
1910s American films